The Transformers: The Movie is a 1986 animated science fiction action film based on the Transformers television series. It was released in North America on August 8, 1986, and in the United Kingdom on December 12, 1986. It was co-produced and directed by Nelson Shin, who also produced the television series. The screenplay was written by Ron Friedman, who created Bionic Six a year later.

The film features the voices of Eric Idle, Judd Nelson, Leonard Nimoy, Casey Kasem, Robert Stack, Lionel Stander, John Moschitta Jr., Scatman Crothers, Peter Cullen, Frank Welker, and Orson Welles, who died 10 months before the film's release, in his final film role. The soundtrack comprises electronic music composed by Vince DiCola and songs from rock and heavy metal acts including Stan Bush and "Weird Al" Yankovic.

The story is set in 2005, 20 years after the TV series' second season. After a Decepticon assault devastates Autobot City, Optimus Prime wins a deadly one-on-one duel with Megatron, but ultimately sustains fatal injuries in the encounter. With Megatron gravely injured, the Decepticons are forced to retreat, saving the Autobots. The Autobots are hunted across the galaxy by Unicron, a planet-sized Transformer intending to consume Cybertron and who transfigures Megatron to become the enslaved Galvatron.

Hasbro's exclusively toy-focused agenda demanded a product refresh, to be contrived by the on-screen death of many prominent starring characters, at the protest of some creators of the film and TV series. The slaughter of characters, especially Optimus Prime, inadvertently upset the young audience, prompting a letter writing campaign from upset viewers of the film.

At the time of its release, the film underperformed at the box-office and received generally negative reviews for its plot and violent deaths, while praising the animation, voice acting and score. However, critical reception has improved over the years and the film has gained a cult following.

Plot 

In the then-future of 2005, a sentient artificial planet known as Unicron devours the planet Lithone along with all but one of its' inhabitants, who flees into space aboard an escape rocket.
Elsewhere, the evil Decepticons have conquered the heroic Autobots' home planet of Cybertron. The Autobots, under the leadership of Optimus Prime and secretly operating from Cybertron's two moons, prepare a counter-offensive to retake Cybertron. Prime sends a shuttle to Autobot City on Earth for supplies. However, their plan is discovered by the Decepticons, who hijack the ship and kill the crew consisting of Ironhide, Prowl, Ratchet and Brawn. In Autobot City, Hot Rod, relaxing with Daniel Witwicky (son of human ally Spike Witwicky) spots the overrun shuttle and a deadly battle breaks out. Optimus arrives with reinforcements just as the Decepticons are near victory. Optimus defeats many of them and engages Megatron in a final battle, leaving both mortally wounded, forcing the surviving Decepticons to retreat, boarding troop transporter Astrotrain to return to Cybertron.

On his deathbed, the fatally wounded Optimus Prime passes the powerful artifact, the Matrix of Leadership to Ultra Magnus naming him his successor as leader and reciting the prophecy that its power will light the Autobots' darkest hour. It drops from Optimus's hands and is caught by Hot Rod, who hands it to Ultra Magnus. Optimus Prime then succumbs to his injuries and passes away.

Meanwhile enroute to Cybertron, Astrotrain requests the Decepticons to jettison weight as he is too low on fuel to return to Cybertron. Starscream then goads the surviving Decepticons into dumping a group of their dying and wounded (consisting of Skywarp, Thundercracker, Shrapnel, Bombshell and Kickback) into space. Starscream then personally casts the dying Megatron into space despite his protests. Drifting into deep space, the wounded Decepticons then encounter Unicron, who offers Megatron a new body in exchange for his service in destroying the Matrix of Leadership; the only thing capable of destroying him. Megatron reluctantly agrees and is recreated into Galvatron, while the corpses of other jettisoned Decepticons are reformatted into his new troops: Cyclonus, Scourge, and a group of Sweeps. Given a new spacecraft by Unicron, Galvatron is then sent on his mission to find and destroy the Matrix.

On Cybertron, Galvatron disrupts Starscream's coronation as Decepticon leader, using his new particle-laser cannon alternate mode to disintegrate him. Unicron then enters Cybertron space, consuming the moons of Cybertron including Autobots Jazz, Cliffjumper, Bumblebee and Spike. Retaking command of the Decepticons, Galvatron leads his forces to seek out Ultra Magnus at the ruined Autobot City on Earth.

The surviving Autobots escape into space aboard separate shuttles. Hot Rod, Kup and the Autobot team of Dinobots are shot down by the Decepticons and crash land on a nearby planet. Ultra Magnus and his group escape by separating their spacecraft and fooling their pursuers into believing them destroyed. Damaged by battle, they continue on to the nearby Planet of Junk.
Meanwhile, separated from the Dinobots in the crash, Hot Rod and Kup are taken prisoner by the Quintessons, a collective of tyrannical robotic aliens who hold kangaroo courts and execute prisoners by feeding them to their Sharkticons. Hot Rod and Kup learn of Unicron from Kranix, the lone survivor of the destroyed planet Lithone. After Kranix is executed, Hot Rod and Kup escape, aided by the Dinobots and the small Autobot survivalist Wheelie, who helps them find an escape ship.

The other Autobots led by Magnus land on Junk where they begin to use the scrap and refuse to affect repairs. Galvatron's forces then arrive and attack. Ultra Magnus secures the remaining Autobots and attempts to open the Matrix to no avail. He is destroyed by Galvatron who seizes the Matrix, now intent on using it to defy and enslave Unicron. The Autobots are then attacked by the territorial natives, the Junkions led by Wreck-Gar, who are then interrupted by the arrival of Hot Rod, Kup and the Dinobots. Using a universal greeting, Hot Rod ceases the battle between the group and the Junkions then rebuild Magnus. Deducing that Galvatron has the Matrix, the Autobots and Junkions then fly to Cybertron. Galvatron attempts to open the Matrix in order to threaten Unicron, but cannot activate it. Enraged by his defiance,  Unicron transforms, revealing a planet-sized robot form and begins to destroy Cybertron. The Decepticons counterattack with Galvatron being swallowed by Unicron along with the Matrix.

The arriving Autobots crash their spaceship through Unicron's eye and become separated while Unicron continues to battle Decepticons, Junkions, and other defenders of Cybertron. Daniel saves his father Spike and the other consumed Autobots from Unicron's digestive system. Galvatron attempts to form an alliance with Hot Rod, but Unicron telepathically forces him to attack. Hot Rod is almost killed but, at the last second, successfully activates the nearby Matrix, its' power reformatting him into Rodimus Prime, the new Autobot leader. Rodimus defeats Galvatron by hurling him into deep space and uses the Matrix's power to destroy Unicron, its energy tearing him apart from the inside. Rodimus then reunites and escapes with the other Autobots as Unicron's giant body disintegrates in a massive explosion. With the Decepticons in disarray from Unicron's attack, the Autobots successfully retake Cybertron and celebrate the war's end, while Unicron's severed head orbits Cybertron.

Cast

Development

Writing
The Transformers television series began broadcasting in 1984 to promote the Transformers toys by Hasbro; The Transformers: The Movie was conceived as a commercial tie-in to promote the 1986 line of toys. The TV series featured no deaths, and the writers had already deliberately assigned familial identities to characters for young children to associate with; however, Hasbro ordered that the film kill off several existing characters to refresh the cast. 

Director Nelson Shin recalled: "[Hasbro] created the story using characters that could best be merchandised for the film. Only with that consideration could I have freedom to change the storyline." Screenwriter Ron Friedman, who had written for the TV series, advised against killing Autobot leader Optimus Prime. He said in a 2013 interview: "To remove Optimus Prime, to physically remove Daddy from the family, that wasn't going to work. I told Hasbro and their lieutenants they would have to bring him back but they said no and had 'great things planned'. In other words, they were going to create new, more expensive toys."

According to the screenwriters, Hasbro underestimated the extent to which Prime's death would shock the young audience. Story consultant Flint Dille said: "We didn't know that he was an icon. It was a toy show. We just thought we were killing off the old product line to replace it with new products. [...] Kids were crying in the theaters. We heard about people leaving the movie. We were getting a lot of nasty notes about it. There was some kid who locked himself in his bedroom for two weeks." Optimus Prime was subsequently revived in the TV series. 

A scene in which Ultra Magnus is drawn and quartered was scripted and storyboarded, but replaced with a scene of him being shot. Another unproduced scene would have killed "basically the entire '84 product line" in a charge against the Decepticons.

Production
The film's budget was $6 million, six times greater than that of the equivalent 90 minutes of the TV series. Shin's team of almost one hundred personnel normally took three months to make one episode of the series, so the extra budget did not help the considerable time constraints from the concurrent production of both the film and TV series. Shin conceived of Prime's body fading to grey to show that "the spirit was gone from the body".

Toei Animation vice president Kozo Morishita spent one year in the United States during production. He supervised the art direction, insisting the Transformers be given several layers of shading and shadows for a dynamic and detailed appearance.

The Transformers: The Movie is the final film featuring Orson Welles. Welles spent the day of October 5, 1985, performing Unicron's voice on set, and died on October 10. Slate reported that his "voice was apparently so weak by the time he made his recording that technicians needed to run it through a synthesizer to salvage it". Shin stated that Welles had originally been pleased to accept the role after reading the script and had expressed an admiration for animated films. Shortly before his death, Welles told his biographer, Barbara Leaming, "You know what I did this morning? I played the voice of a toy. I play a planet. I menace somebody called Something-or-other. Then I'm destroyed. My plan to destroy Whoever-it-is is thwarted and I tear myself apart on the screen."

Soundtrack

Stan Bush's song "The Touch" is prominently featured in the film, having been originally written for the Sylvester Stallone film Cobra (1986). A remix is in the 2012 video game Transformers: Fall of Cybertron, and in the 2018 film Bumblebee. The soundtrack includes "Instruments of Destruction" by NRG, "Dare" by Stan Bush, "Nothin's Gonna Stand in Our Way" and "Hunger" by Kick Axe (credited as Spectre General), "Dare To Be Stupid" by "Weird Al" Yankovic, and a hard rock remake of the Transformers TV theme song by Lion.

Release 
The film was released on August 8, 1986 to 990 screens in the United States, grossing  on opening weekend. It opened at 14th place behind About Last Night, which had already been in theaters for five weeks. Its final box office gross of  made it the 99th-highest-grossing film of 1986. In that year, Hasbro lost a total of $10 million on its two collaborations with the one-year-old and serially failing film distribution company, De Laurentiis Entertainment Group (DEG): My Little Pony: The Movie and then Transformers: The Movie. Box office returns were booming across the industry, but several other small young distribution companies were similarly failing due to bulk production of many cheap films. Furthermore, Transformers: The Movie was reportedly "lost in an already-crowded summer lineup" including Short Circuit, Ferris Bueller's Day Off, Labyrinth, Big Trouble in Little China, The Karate Kid: Part II, Aliens, Howard the Duck, Stand by Me, Flight of the Navigator, and The Fly.

Across the decades, Transformers has become a cult classic, which yielded a remastering, several home media re-releases, and more theatrical screenings. In September 2018, the film was screened for one night in the United States, in 450 (later increased by 300, totaling 750) theaters.

Home media 
The film was animated in 4:3 "fullscreen" format, and the trailer promises "spectacular widescreen action". The feature was vertically cropped to widescreen dimensions for theatrical showings and released in fullscreen on VHS and DVD.

United States
The film was originally released in 1987 on VHS, Betamax, and LaserDisc in North America by Family Home Entertainment. This print of the film removes the usage of profanity said by Spike, but retains Ultra Magnus' line.

Rhino Home Video released the film on VHS in 1999. This version uses the UK master which has scrolling text and narration at the beginning to replace the cast credits, and an additional closing narration assuring viewers that "Optimus Prime will return." The company released the film on DVD on November 7, 2000 with a newly remastered print based on the US version, and restores Spike's swear. It distributed exclusively in Canada by Seville Pictures.

Following Rhino's home video rights to Sunbow's catalog expiring, Sony Wonder released a two-disc 20th-anniversary special edition on November 7, 2006. This release featured a brand-new widescreen remaster of the film, in addition to the original fullscreen version. The extras include several audio commentaries, newly produced behind-the-scenes featurettes, storyboards, commercials, and an episode from Transformers: Victory – "Scramble City: Mobilization". However, it only features audio commentary.

Shout! Factory released a 30th-anniversary edition on Blu-ray and DVD on September 13, 2016. Shout! Factory released a 35th-anniversary edition on 4K Ultra HD Blu-ray on August 3, 2021.

United Kingdom
The film was initially released on VHS in September 1987 by Video Gems. This print of the film uses the same master used for the UK theatrical release but excludes the swear words. The film was re-released in February 2000 by Maverick Entertainment.

Maverick would release the film on DVD in November 2001, which once again used the UK print, but used the sound master from the US DVD, which restores Spike's swear. It features an episode of the Transformers: The Headmasters anime as a bonus, alongside the theatrical trailer and a picture gallery. This version was later released on VHS in April 2002, which also contains the Headmasters episode. Afterwards, the home video rights transferred over from Maverick to Metrodome Distribution after TV-Loonland AG's purchase of a stake in the company.

In March and June of 2003, Prism Leisure released a budget DVD release of the film.

Metrodome Distribution releasing The Transformers: The Movie - Reconstructed in September 2005, which featured a newly remastered version of the film that exposed the entire visible picture from the film's negative. The film was also released on UMD the following month.

In June 2007, Metrodome Distribution released an "Ultimate Edition" two-disc of the movie, one month prior to the release of the live-action Transformers film, which featured the same remastered widescreen print from the Sony Wonder release on Disc 1, alongside the UK version on Disc 2. Its extras include many from the Remastered edition, plus fan commentary, a fan-made trailer, interviews with Peter Cullen and Flint Dille, and "Scramble City". This was followed up with a UMD reissue and a Blu-ray release in October 2007. This release uses an upscaled version of the 2006 widescreen remaster print, although it lacks bonus features.

In December 2016, Manga Entertainment released the 30th Anniversary Edition as a limited-edition Blu-ray steelbook, and released the standard edition on DVD and Blu-ray a year later. This release uses the same master and prints from the US Shout! Factory release, being released under license from the company. Funimation UK later reissued the Blu-ray and released the movie on 4K Blu-ray in October 2021, once again using the same prints and masters from the Shout! Factory release.

Japan
On January 25, 2001, Pioneer LDC released the film on Region 2 DVD with Japanese and English audio (which was presented in the UK version). That release is no longer in print.

Reception

Initial reception 
Contemporary film critics had a mostly negative tone. Many perceived a thin but darkly violent plot appealing only to children, based on blatant advertisement, unintelligible action, and supposedly lookalike characters. The day after release, Caryn James of The New York Times described the film: "While all this action may captivate young children, the animation is not spectacular enough to dazzle adults, and the Transformers have few truly human elements to lure parents along, even when their voices are supplied by well-known actors."

Scott Cain reported a "packed theater", but complained that "as a jaundiced adult", he "never had the slightest clue as to what was taking place" even after consulting several excited children {who assured him it didn't make sense for them either, but "who loved it anyway") and the four-page studio synopsis (which he coul not reconcile with what he had seen). He was disappointed that he could not identify the voices of several famous actors and concluded that "non-stop action is sufficient for kiddie audiences but ... I am offended that The Transformers is a 90-minute toy commercial. Even worse, it paints a future in which war is incessant. The only human child among the characters is in tears almost constantly." 

Similarly, Richard Martin said "It's everything you'd expect from a Saturday morning cartoon blown up to feature length and designed to sell more toys to more kids. [... Unicron is] a monster planet that consumes everything in its path, just as the movie seems set to do." Jack Zink said "Dino De Laurentiis has seen the future, and it is spare parts", calling the film "a wall-to-wall demolition derby for kids". As "an animated, heavy-metal comic book [with a] maddeningly simple story", he said "The art and graphics may be substantially more complex than the TV series but the net visual result is less impressive than most viewers have a right to expect. [...] Not bad for what it is, but not much in the face of precedents like Heavy Metal (1981) and Fritz the Cat (1972)." He said most of its characters are descended from Mad Max and Luke Skywalker, and "have learned the art of the civil insult".

The 1987 VHS release remained on the Billboard Top Kid Video Sales top 25 chart for at least 40 weeks.

Later reception 
The review aggregator Rotten Tomatoes reports that 62% of the 26 surveyed critics gave The Transformers: The Movie a positive review. The site's critical consensus reads: "A surprisingly dark, emotional, and almost excessively cynical experience for Transformers fans."

In 2007, John Swansburg of Slate wrote, "Though a modest film compared with Michael Bay's blockbuster [2007 Transformers], the original Transformers is the better film ... [T]here's nothing even approaching the original's narrative depth." He recalled the film giving him a new curse word and childhood trauma: "only in our scariest nightmares would we have imagined that a mere 20 minutes into the movie, Optimus Prime, the most beloved of Autobots, would be killed ... It just blew me away. Witnessing death on that scale was [...] every bit as shocking as War of the Worlds had been for Grandma and Grandpa".

Gabe Toro of CinemaBlend wrote in 2014: "...Transformers: The Movie otherwise provides the sort of chase-heavy thrills that comes from robots that can become cars. Contrast that with Michael Bay's vision, where the robots basically abandon their transforming skills to have endless, violent punch-outs that annihilate cities. Bay's films show the action as a junkyard orgy. The '86 offering slows down to allow for actors like Leonard Nimoy and, yes, even Orson Welles to give actual performances. Fans of Michael Bay's Transformers movies are free to enjoy them. But they'll never top the gravity and excitement of The Transformers: The Movie."

Kashann Kilson of Inverse wrote in 2015: "[N]ostalgia is a funny thing: for many of us in the 30-and-over Transformers fan club, that first movie was an integral part of our childhood. To hell with what the reviews said—the O.G. Transformers movie rocked our collective worlds ... We still love the original so much today, part of the fun of watching Bay's explosion-fests is being able to wave our canes at the youngsters and wax poetic about how back in our day, Hollywood knew how to make a real movie about giant, alien robot warriors."

In 2017, film historian Leonard Maltin gave the picture the lowest possible rating in his Movie & Video Guide and wrote, "Little more than an obnoxious, feature-length toy commercial...That deafening rock score certainly doesn't help."

In the late 2010s, Den of Geek published several retrospective reviews focusing on the film's gruesome but quirky tone, and on the traumatic cultural impact of its violence which is heavier than most preceding animated films. In 2018, it said "the shadow of death hung like a black curtain" over the film and called the psychedelic scenes of Unicron's world-eating guts "a futuristic rendering of Dante's Inferno" in "apocalyptic detail". In 2019, the film was called "The Great Toy Massacre of 1986" which "traumatized a generation of kids with a string of startling deaths". It is remembered as "a story about death, transfiguration, guilt, and redemption", and as "a milestone in animation history".

Comic book adaptations

See also 
 GoBots: Battle of the Rock Lords

References

External links 

 
 
 
 
 
 Storyboards from The Transformers: The Movie not included on the DVD

1980s American animated films
1980s children's animated films
1980s science fiction action films
1980s war films
1986 animated films
1986 films
1986 independent films
American children's animated space adventure films
Animated films based on animated series
Animated coming-of-age films
American children's animated science fiction films
American independent films
Animated science fiction films
American science fiction action films
American science fiction war films
De Laurentiis Entertainment Group films
1980s English-language films
Films based on television series
Films directed by Nelson Shin
Films scored by Vince DiCola
Films set in the United States
Films set in 2005
Films set in the future
Films set on fictional planets
Films with screenplays by Ron Friedman
Films about Japanese Americans
Japanese animated science fiction films
Marvel Productions films
Sunbow Entertainment films
Toei Animation films
Transformers (franchise) animated films